Teschen District was a political district (equivalent to okres in the Czech Republic and powiat in Poland) in Austrian Silesia of the Austrian Empire (and since 1867 of Austria-Hungary) existing between 1850–1855 and 1868–1920. Its administrative center was the city of Teschen (now Cieszyn, Poland and Český Těšín, Czech Republic).

History 
Revolutions of 1848 in the Austrian Empire led to various social, legal and also administrative reforms. In late December 1849, Austrian Silesia was re-established and was initially subdivided into seven political districts, including one with the seat in Teschen. Political districts were additionally divided into legal districts (German: Gerichtsbezirk). Teschen political district consisted at the beginning of three legal districts: Teschen, Freistadt (Czech: Fryštát, Polish: Frysztat) and Jablunkau (Czech: Jablunkov, Polish: Jabłonków). In the era of Bach's neo-absolutism political districts were abolished and replaced by district offices (German: Bezirksamt) encompassing territories of the abolished legal districts. Political districts were re-established in 1868. Teschen political district was reshaped to include legal district of Friedek (before 1855 a separate political district) whereas Freistadt legal district was excluded to form the new Freistadt political district.

In 1880 Teschen political district was administratively divided into 101 municipalities (49 in Teschen legal district, 32 in Friedek, 20 in Jablunkau). Until 1890 this number grew to 102 (Žermanice were separated from Horní Bludovice) and on 1 January 1890 to 103 (separation of Lomná into Dolní Lomná and Horní Lomná). On 1 October 1901 Friedek legal district (with 33 municipalities) was excluded to form the re-established Friedek political district. After this Teschen political district had an area of 730 km², 70 municipalities (49 in Teschen legal district and 21 in Jablunkau).

According to the censuses conducted in 1880, 1890, 1900 and 1910 the population Teschen and Jablunkov legal districts were as follows:

Traditionally the territory of those two legal districts was inhabited by Cieszyn Vlachs in the north and Silesian Gorals in the south, speaking Cieszyn Silesian and Jablunkov dialects. The results of those censuses and factors shaping national identity of the local population became a perennial subject of the political squabbles in the region. Additionally in terms of religion in 1910 the population with permanent residence consisted of Roman Catholics (56,924 or 55.5%), Protestants (42,738 or 41.7%), Jews (2,689 or 2,6%) and 201 others.

After World War I and fall of Austria-Hungary the region of Cieszyn Silesia including the territory of Teschen political district became disputed land between Czechoslovakia and Poland. This led to Polish–Czechoslovak War and the division of the region and district on 28 July 1920, by a decision of the Spa Conference. The part of Teschen district that was found within Czechoslovakia was superseded by Český Těšín District whereas the other part found in Poland was replaced by Cieszyn County, that was enlarged by municipalities of Freistadt and Bielitz districts.

Municipal division 
As of 1910:
Jablunkau legal district (Gerichtsbezirk Jablunkau)
 Bistrzitz
 Boconowitz
 Bukowetz
 Grudek
 Istebna
 Jablunkau (town)
 Jaworzinka
 Karpentna
 Koniakau
 Koszarzisk
 Lischbitz
 Unter Lomna
 Ober Lomna
 Millikau
 Mosty
 Nawsi
 Niedek
 Oldrzychowitz
 Piosek
 Tyra
 Wendrin

Teschen legal district (Gerichtsbezirk Teschen)
 Bażanowitz
 Nieder Bludowitz
 Bobrek
 Brzezuwka
 Nieder Dattin
 Dobratitz
 Nieder Domaslowitz
 Ober Domaslowitz
 Dzingelau
 Kameral Ellgoth
 Grodischcz
 Gumna
 Gutty
 Haslach
 Hnojnik
 Kojkowitz
 Konskau
 Kotzobendz
 Krasna
 Nieder Lischna
 Ober Lischna
 Mistrzowitz
 Mönichhof
 Mosty
 Niebory
 Ogrodzon
 Pastwisk
 Pogwisdau
 Punzau
 Roppitz
 Rzeka
 Schibitz
 Schöbischowitz
 Schumbarg
 Smilowitz
 Stanislowitz
 Teschen (town)
 Nieder Tieritzko
 Ober Tierlitzko
 Nieder Toschonowitz
 Ober Toschonowitz
 Trzanowitz
 Trzynietz
 Trzytiesch
 Wielopoli
 Zamarsk
 Nieder Zukau
 Ober Zukau
 Zywotitz

References 

Districts of Austria
Habsburg Silesia
Cieszyn Silesia
History of Czech Silesia